Montcalm is a regional county municipality in the Lanaudière region of Quebec, Canada. Its seat is Sainte-Julienne.

The population according to the 2021 Canadian Census was 58,680

Subdivisions
There are 10 subdivisions within the RCM:

Cities & Towns (1)
 Saint-Lin–Laurentides

Municipalities (9)
 Saint-Alexis
 Saint-Calixte
 Saint-Esprit
 Saint-Jacques
 Sainte-Julienne
 Saint-Liguori
 Sainte-Marie-Salomé
 Saint-Roch-de-l'Achigan
 Saint-Roch-Ouest

Transportation

Access Routes
Highways and numbered routes that run through the municipality, including external routes that start or finish at the county border:

 Autoroutes
 

 Principal Highways
 
 

 Secondary Highways
 
 
 
 
 

 External Routes
 None

See also
 List of regional county municipalities and equivalent territories in Quebec

References

External links
 MRC Montcalm 

Regional county municipalities in Lanaudière
Census divisions of Quebec